The 1878 Flint Boroughs by-election was fought on 5 July 1878.  The byelection was fought due to the death of the incumbent Liberal MP, Peter Ellis Eyton.  It was won by the Liberal candidate John Roberts.

References

1878 in Wales
1870s elections in Wales
History of Flintshire
1878 elections in the United Kingdom
By-elections to the Parliament of the United Kingdom in Welsh constituencies